The 1991 South American Under-17 Football Championship was the fourth edition of the South American Under-17 Football Championship, a football competition for the under-17 national teams in South America organized by CONMEBOL. It was held in Paraguay from 4 to 19 May 1991.

Brazil were crowned champions, and together with Argentina and Uruguay, which were the top three teams of this tournament, qualified for the 1991 FIFA U-17 World Championship in Italy.

Teams

 

 (title holders)

 (hosts)

Match officials
The referees were:

 Juan Carlos Crespi
 Pablo Peña
 Ulises Tavares
 Iván Guerrero
 Carlos Robles
 Jorge Zuluaga
 Milton Villavicencio
 Sabino Fariña
 Fernando Chappel
 Fernando Cardellino
 Jorge Nieto
 Jorge Nieves
 Nelson Rodriguez

Venues
The main venue was Estadio Defensores del Chaco, Asunción with some games being played at Estadio Manuel Ferreira and Estadio General Pablo Rojas in the same city. Estadio Juan Canuto Pettengill, Itauguá and Estadio Feliciano Cáceres, Luque were also used.

First stage
The top two teams in each group advanced to the final stage.

Tiebreakers
When teams finished level of points, the final rankings were determined according to:

 goal difference
 goals scored
 head-to-head result between tied teams (two teams only)
 drawing of lots

All times local, PAT (UTC−4).

Group A

Group B

Final stage
When teams finished level of points, the final rankings were determined according to the same criteria as the first stage, taking into account only matches in the final stage.

Winners

Goalscorers

Qualified teams for FIFA U-17 World Championship
The following three teams from CONMEBOL qualified for the 1991 FIFA U-17 World Championship.

References

1991
1991 South American Under-16 Championship
1991 in South American football
1991 in Paraguayan football
1991 in youth association football